Sandnessund Bridge is a cantilever road bridge that crosses the Sandnes Strait between the islands of Tromsøya and Kvaløya in Tromsø Municipality in Troms og Finnmark county, Norway. The Tromsø Bridge, the Tromsøysund Tunnel, and this bridge are the three road connections into the city of Tromsø on the island of Tromsøya. 

The  Sandnessund Bridge was constructed out of concrete and it has 36 spans supporting it. This bridge is part of Norwegian County Road 862. Sandnessund Bridge was officially opened by Crown Prince Harald on 26 June 1974, although it had already opened for traffic on 21 December 1973. The bridge cost . It was a toll bridge until 1 May 1982.

See also
List of bridges in Norway
List of bridges in Norway by length
List of bridges
List of bridges by length

References

External links

Bridges completed in 1973
Road bridges in Troms og Finnmark
Buildings and structures in Tromsø
1973 establishments in Norway
Former toll bridges in Norway
Cantilever bridges